Israel Militosyan (born 17 August 1968) is an Armenian former weightlifter. He was awarded the Honoured Master of Sports of the USSR title in 1989.

Early life
Born in Leninakan, Armenian SSR (now Gyumri, Armenia), a city famous for its world class weightlifters, Militosyan took up weightlifting in 1980 under the guidance of cousin Vardan Militosyan and joined the Soviet national team in 1987.

Career
Militosyan was one of the top weightlifters of his era. He made his Olympic debut at the 1988 Summer Olympics in Seoul. He won a silver medal in the lightweight (67.5 kg) class with a total of 337.5 kg, only 2.5 kg behind gold medalist Joachim Kunz. Despite the defeat, Militosyan set a new Olympic record in the snatch at 155 kg.

The following year, Militosyan became both a European and a World Champion by winning gold medal at the 1989 European Weightlifting Championships and 1989 World Weightlifting Championships. At the World Weightlifting Championships in Athens, Militosyan set the world record in the snatch at 158.5 kg and then, in his next lift, broke his own world record at 160 kg.

Militosyan would come in second to rival Yoto Yotov at the next three European Weightlifting Championships and at the 1991 World Weightlifting Championships. As such, Yotov was considered the gold medal favorite at the up-coming Olympics and Militosyan was expected to repeat his silver medal achievement.

Though the Soviet Union was disbanded, Militosyan and the other Soviet Olympians still competed together under the Unified Team at the 1992 Summer Olympics in Barcelona. In the snatch, Militosyan lifted 155 kg, breaking his own previous Olympic record (150 kg), and lifted 182.5 kg in the clean and jerk, setting an Olympic total of 337.5 kg yet again and this time winning the Olympic gold medal, defeating silver medalist Yotov by 10 kg. To this day, Militosyan is the last Armenian weightlifter to become an Olympic Champion.

Following the 1992 Olympics, Militosyan began representing his native Armenia.

Militosyan set the world record in the snatch for a third time in 1994 at the 1994 European Weightlifting Championships in Sokolov. the weight limit change. Militosyan is the first weightlifter from the independent Armenia to set a world record in weightlifting. Militosyan represented Armenia in its Olympic debut at the 1996 Summer Olympics, where he came in sixth place.

Militosyan retired from weightlifting in 1999 and later worked as a weightlifting coach in his hometown of Gyumri.

Personal life
Israel is a cousin and student of fellow Soviet-Armenian Olympic weightlifting medalist Vardan Militosyan. Vardan was the first Soviet-Armenian to win an Olympic medal in weightlifting, and Israel was the last.

References

External links
 Israel Militosyan at Lift Up
 

1968 births
Living people
Sportspeople from Gyumri
Armenian male weightlifters
Soviet male weightlifters
Honoured Masters of Sport of the USSR
Weightlifters at the 1988 Summer Olympics
Weightlifters at the 1992 Summer Olympics
Weightlifters at the 1996 Summer Olympics
Olympic weightlifters of the Soviet Union
Olympic weightlifters of the Unified Team
Olympic weightlifters of Armenia
Olympic gold medalists for the Unified Team
Olympic silver medalists for the Soviet Union
Olympic medalists in weightlifting
Soviet Armenians
Medalists at the 1992 Summer Olympics
Medalists at the 1988 Summer Olympics
European Weightlifting Championships medalists
World Weightlifting Championships medalists